Joint-Stock Commercial Aloqabank (Aloqabank) is an Uzbek banking and financial services company headquartered in Tashkent.

Aloqabank was founded under the Resolution of the Cabinet of Ministers of the Republic of Uzbekistan No. 502 on October, 12th in 1994.

Ownership 

At 1 July 2016, the interest of the shareholders in the Bank’s share capital was:

Management 

The Chairman of the Board (CEO) is Kammuna Irisbekova, confirmed by the General Meeting of Shareholders in September 2017.

The Chairman of the Supervisory Board of Aloqabank is Sherzod Shermatov, Acting Minister of Development of Information Technologies and Communications of the Republic of Uzbekistan.

Main business 
The main business activities of the bank are:

Retail Banking 
 automated teller machines
 deposits taking
 provision of loans
 local and international payments and settlements
 debit cards

Corporate Banking 
 bills acceptance and discounting
 issuing of financial bonds
 provision of letters of credit and guarantee facilities
 bank card business

Aloqabank is a participant of:
 Uzbekistan Banking Association
 Currency Exchange of the Republic of Uzbekistan
 Fund for “Guaranteeing citizens' deposits in banks”
 “Tashkent” Republican Stock Exchange
 National payment system of Uzbekistan
 International payment system SWIFT
 International payment system VISA
 Association of Lessors of Uzbekistan.

Operations 
Bank provides a wide range of bank services to the enterprises of the real sector of the economy, small business, private entrepreneurship entities and population in amount of 350,000 through 14 branches, 23 minibanks, 105 operational cash offices and 22 international money transfer offices located in the Republic of Karakalpakstan, regions and Tashkent city.

Financial indicators 
According to the audited IFRS report by Deloitte & Touche as of year-end 2015, total assets comprised 1,188.4 billion soum; net profit and equity constituted 29.0 and 173.8 billion soum respectively.
Earnings per preference share (2015) accounted for 114 soum; earnings per ordinary share (2015) comprised 27 soum.
Tier 1 Capital Adequacy Ratio = 16.26%
Regulative Capital Adequacy Ratio = 17.01%

Ratings

See also 

 Banking in Uzbekistan
 Central Bank of Uzbekistan

References

External links

Banks of Uzbekistan
Companies based in Tashkent
Banks established in 1994
1994 establishments in Uzbekistan